Ray Jefferson is an American government official and retired military officer who served as assistant secretary of labor for the Veterans' Employment and Training Service. He graduated from the United States Military Academy and served in the United States Army. During a training session while serving as an Army officer with Special Forces, he lost all of his fingers on his left hand while attempting to protect his teammates from a defective hand grenade that was detonating prematurely. 

In 2009 he was appointed to his position at the United States Department of Labor. He resigned in 2011 after an Inspector General's report concluded he violated federal procurement rules. In 2019 the Inspector General reversed its ruling, stating the claims were unsubstantiated. As of 2020 he worked as the president of a global leadership consultancy company.

Early life and education

Jefferson's parents were public servants. He was raised in Albany, New York. Jefferson graduated from the United States Military Academy in 1988 with a Bachelor of Science degree in leadership. Jefferson earned a Master of Public Administration in Strategic Management from the Kennedy School of Government, graduating with distinction as a Littauer Fellow. He also earned an MBA from Harvard Business School and received the Dean's Award for exceptional leadership and service.

Career

Military and government service 
Jefferson served as an Army Officer with the infantry and Special Forces, as well as the Presidential Honor Guard, 3rd Ranger Battalion, and 1st Special Forces Group. In 1999, he lost all five fingers on his left hand while attempting to protect his teammates from a hand grenade detonating prematurely during Special Forces training. Jefferson recuperated from his injuries at the Tripler Army Medical Center in Hawaii.

Jefferson served as a White House Fellow from 2000 to 2001 as a special assistant to the United States secretary of commerce and the under secretary of state for management. Jefferson then served as a Fulbright Fellow in Singapore studying leadership within Asian contexts.

In January 2003 Jefferson was appointed deputy director of Hawaii Department of Business, Economic Development and Tourism. In July 2003, Jefferson was awarded the Harrison H. Schmitt Leadership Award for dedication to public service. He also worked in Singapore as a leadership consultant at McKinsey & Company developing leadership training and development programs for his clients.

United States Department of Labor 
In 2009, Jefferson was appointed by President Obama as assistant secretary for the Veterans' Employment and Training Service (VETS) of the United States Department of Labor. 

Jefferson resigned from his position as assistant secretary on July 25, 2011, following accusations that he violated federal procurement rules. An Inspector General's report alleged that two whistleblowers reported that Jefferson directed VETS employees to award contracts to management consultant Stewart Liff at a higher cost than what could have been procured in an open selection process. On September 26, 2019 the inspector general reversed a predecessor's finding stating the accusations could not be substantiated. The government also agreed to pay some of Jefferson's legal fees.

Post-government career 
Jefferson is the President of Jefferson Group, a global leadership consultancy based in Singapore.

Department of Veterans Affairs 
In March 2022, Jefferson was nominated by President Joe Biden to serve as under secretary of veterans affairs for benefits. However, his nomination was withdrawn on July 11, 2022 after stalling in committee over Republicans' objections.

References

Living people
Harvard Kennedy School alumni
United States Military Academy alumni
Harvard Business School alumni
United States Department of Labor officials
1966 births
People from Guilderland, New York